The Prix Émile Augier is a literary prize bestowed by the Académie française, with a silver medal from the Academy.

It is an annual award that was first given sporadically from the late 19th century until 1961. It was reestablished in 1994 as a collaboration with the foundations Émile Augier, Eugène Brieux, Paul Hervieu and de Soussay. The prize is intended to reward a work relating to drama.

Laureates 

 1895: François Coppée, Pour la Couronne
 1899: Jean Richepin, Le Chemineau
 1902: , Pour l’Amour
 1905:
 Henry Bataille, Résurrection
 Émile Fabre, La Rabouilleuse
 Georges Mitchell, L’Absent
 1908:
 Alfred Bouchinet, Son père
 Émile Fabre, Les ventres dorés
 Albert Guinon, Son père
 Catulle Mendès, Glatigny
 1911: , L’Alibi
 1914: Marie Lenéru, Les Affranchies
 1917: Gaston Devore, L’Envolée
 1920: Miguel Zamacoïs, M. Césarin écrivain public
 1923: Paul Raynal, Le maître de son cœur
 1926: Lucien Besnard, L’homme qui n’est plus de ce monde
 1929: André Boussac de Saint-Marc, Moloch
 1932: , La Double passion
 1938: François Mauriac, collected works
 1941: , Fabienne
 1951: Jean Sylvain, Le père Damien
 1961: , La Fin du monde
 1996: , Mon mot à dire and all his work (Nizet)
 2001: Pierre Barillet, Quatre années sans relâche (Bernard de Fallois)
 2004: , Agnès Belladone (Avant-Scène Théâtre)
 2005: , S'opposer à l'orage (Arche-Éditeur)
 2007: Françoise Dorner, La Douceur assassine (Albin Michel)
 2009: Patrick Cauvin, Héloïse (Albin Michel)
 2010: , Et l'enfant sur le loup and Les couteaux dans le dos (Avant-Scène Théâtre)
 2012: Michel Bernardy, Le Jeu Verbal, Oralité de la langue française (L'Âge d'Homme)
 2015: Pascal Rambert, Répétition (Les Solitaires intempestifs)
 2016: Laurent Mauvignier, Retour à Berratham (éditions de Minuit)
 2018: Nathalie Boisvert, Antigone au Printemps (Léméac éditions)
 2020: Christine Montalbetti, La Conférence des objets

External links 
 Prix Émile Augier on the site of the Académie française
  Prix Émile Augier on Prix Littéraires.net
 Prix Emile Augier on Livres Hebdo 

French theatre awards
Awards established in 1994
1994 establishments in France